Phoenix Academy may refer to:

Phoenix Academy, Iraq, an army training facility in Taji, Iraq
Phoenix Academy (North Carolina), an elementary school in High Point, North Carolina, United States
Phoenix Academy, Shepherd's Bush, a secondary school in London, England
Phoenix College Preparatory Academy, a high school in Phoenix, Arizona, United States
Phoenix Hebrew Academy, a Jewish day school in Phoenix, Arizona, United States

See also
Phoenix (disambiguation)